Korotayev or Korotaev is a Russian masculine surname, its feminine counterpart is Korotayeva or Korotaeva. It may refer to
Aleksandr Korotayev (born 1992), Russian football player 
Andrey Korotayev (born 1961), Russian political scientist and anthropologist
Yakov Korotayev (1892–1937), Soviet partisan

Russian-language surnames